The 1996 Players Championship was a golf tournament in Florida on the PGA Tour, held  at TPC Sawgrass in Ponte Vedra Beach, southeast of Jacksonville. It was the 23rd Players Championship. 

Fred Couples shot a final round 64 to win his second Players, four strokes ahead of runners-up Colin Montgomerie and Tommy Tolles, the 54-hole leader. Couples' previous win was twelve years earlier in 1984.

Defending champion Lee Janzen finished thirteen strokes back, in a tie for 46th place.

Venue

Eligibility requirements 
The top 125 PGA Tour members from the final 1995 Official Money List
All winners of PGA Tour events awarding official money and official victory status in the preceding 12 months, concluding with the Freeport-McDermott Classic and dating from the 1995 Players Championship
Winners in the last 10 calendar years of The Players Championship, Masters Tournament, U.S. Open, PGA Championship, and NEC World Series of Golf
British Open winners since 1990
Six players, not otherwise eligible, designated by The Players Championship Committee as "special selections"
Any players, not otherwise eligible, who are among the top-10 money-winners from the 1996 Official Money List through the Freeport-McDermott Classic
To complete a field of 144 players, those players in order, not otherwise eligible, from the 1996 Official Money List through the Freeport-McDermott Classic

Source:

Field
Joe Acosta Jr., John Adams, Fulton Allem, Robert Allenby, Billy Andrade, Woody Austin, Paul Azinger, Ian Baker-Finch, Chip Beck, Phil Blackmar, Jay Don Blake, Guy Boros, Michael Bradley, Mike Brisky, Mark Brooks, Brad Bryant, Patrick Burke, Curt Byrum, Mark Calcavecchia, Michael Campbell, Jim Carter, Brandel Chamblee, Brian Claar, Lennie Clements, John Cook, Fred Couples, Ben Crenshaw, John Daly, Marco Dawson, Glen Day, Jay Delsing, Ed Dougherty, David Duval, David Edwards, Joel Edwards, Steve Elkington, Ernie Els, Bob Estes, Brad Fabel, Nick Faldo, Rick Fehr, Keith Fergus, Dan Forsman, Robin Freeman, David Frost, Fred Funk, Jim Furyk, Jim Gallagher Jr., Robert Gamez, Kelly Gibson, Bill Glasson, Paul Goydos, Wayne Grady, Ken Green, Scott Gump, Jay Haas, Mike Heinen, Nolan Henke, Brian Henninger, Tim Herron, Scott Hoch, Mike Hulbert, John Huston, Hale Irwin, Peter Jacobsen, Lee Janzen, Steve Jones, Brian Kamm, Jerry Kelly, Tom Kite, Neal Lancaster, Tom Lehman, Justin Leonard, Bruce Lietzke, Bob Lohr, Davis Love III, Steve Lowery, Sandy Lyle, Andrew Magee, Jeff Maggert, John Mahaffey, Doug Martin, Billy Mayfair, Blaine McCallister, Scott McCarron, Mark McCumber, Jim McGovern, Rocco Mediate, Phil Mickelson, Larry Mize, Colin Montgomerie, Gil Morgan, John Morse, Larry Nelson, Frank Nobilo, Greg Norman, Mark O'Meara, Brett Ogle, David Ogrin, Masashi Ozaki, Naomichi Ozaki, Jesper Parnevik, Craig Parry, Corey Pavin, Kenny Perry, Dan Pohl, Don Pooley, Nick Price, Dillard Pruitt, Tom Purtzer, Mike Reid, Lee Rinker, Loren Roberts, Costantino Rocca, Charlie Rymer, Gene Sauers, Tom Scherrer, Scott Simpson, Joey Sindelar, Vijay Singh, Jeff Sluman, Craig Stadler, Mike Standly, Payne Stewart, Dave Stockton Jr., Curtis Strange, Steve Stricker, Mike Sullivan, Hal Sutton, Tommy Tolles, David Toms, Sam Torrance, Kirk Triplett, Ted Tryba, Bob Tway, Omar Uresti, Scott Verplank, Bobby Wadkins, Lanny Wadkins, Grant Waite, Duffy Waldorf, Tom Watson, Mark Wiebe, John Wilson, Ian Woosnam, Fuzzy Zoeller

Round summaries

First round
Thursday, March 28, 1996
Friday, March 29, 1996

Source:

Second round
Friday, March 29, 1996

Source:

Third round
Saturday, March 30, 1996

Source:

Final round
Sunday, March 31, 1996

References

External links
The Players Championship website

1996
1996 in golf
1996 in American sports
1996 in sports in Florida
March 1996 sports events in the United States